Tora (Now) is the debut album of popular Greek singer, Chrispa. It was released in Greece in 2003 by Alpha Records.

Track listing
 "Esena Thelo"
 "Den To Ennoo"
 "Ohi Pandos Ego"
 "Mi Figis"
 "Parata Me"
 "Tora Mou To Les"
 "To Ksero Pos Tha'rtheis"
 "Tora Boro"
 "Na'ha Dio Zoes"
 "Rimagmeni Gitonia" (featuring Konstantinos Manis)
 "Etsi Ksero Ego"
 "Spirto"
 "Ladi Sti Fotia"
 "Elliniki Tenia"
 "Den Iparhi Tropos"
 "Dakri"
 "Esena Thelo (Valentino Remix)"

References

2003 debut albums
Chrispa albums
Greek-language albums